Huttendorf is a commune in the Bas-Rhin department and Grand Est region of north-eastern France.

Geography
Agriculture, including the rearing of livestock, plays an important part in the village's economy.

History
The first surviving record of the village appears under the name of Hittendorphe and dates from 797. At that time the settlement was part of the lands of the Abbey of Wissembourg.

The church of Saint Vincent dates from 1746, although the tower is older. The organ, dating from 1853, was built by Pierre Rivenach.

See also
 Communes of the Bas-Rhin department

References

Bas-Rhin communes articles needing translation from French Wikipedia
Communes of Bas-Rhin